Edward Mostyn Lloyd-Mostyn, 2nd Baron Mostyn (13 January 1795 – 17 March 1884), was a British peer and Member of Parliament (MP).

Mostyn was the son of Edward Lloyd, 1st Baron Mostyn. Born Edward Lloyd, assumed by Royal licence the additional surname of Mostyn in 1831.

In 1831 he was elected to the House of Commons for Flintshire, a seat he held from 1831 to 1837, from 1841 to 1842 and from 1847 to 1850. He also represented Lichfield from 1846 to 1847. In 1854 he succeeded his father in the barony and entered the House of Lords. In 1839 he served as High Sheriff of Merionethshire, in 1840 as High Sheriff of Caernarvonshire and between 1840 and 1884 as Lord Lieutenant of Merionethshire.

Lord Mostyn married Lady Harriet-Margaret Scott on 20 June 1827. Lady Mostyn was the eldest daughter of the Earl of Clonmel. Lord Mostyn died in March 1884, aged 89, and was succeeded in his titles by his grandson Llewellyn, his eldest son the Hon. Thomas Edward Lloyd-Mostyn having predeceased him.

Issue

1. Hon. Harriet Margaret

2. Thomas Edward b. 23 January 1830

3. Roger b. 1 May 1831

References

Kidd, Charles, Williamson, David (editors). Debrett's Peerage and Baronetage (1990 edition). New York: St Martin's Press, 1990.

External links 
 

1795 births
1884 deaths
Barons in the Peerage of the United Kingdom
Eldest sons of British hereditary barons
Lord-Lieutenants of Merionethshire
Lloyd-Mostyn, Mostyn
Lloyd-Mostyn, Mostyn
Lloyd-Mostyn, Mostyn
Lloyd-Mostyn, Mostyn
Lloyd-Mostyn, Mostyn
Lloyd-Mostyn, Mostyn
Lloyd-Mostyn, Mostyn
Lloyd-Mostyn, Mostyn
UK MPs who inherited peerages
High Sheriffs of Caernarvonshire
High Sheriffs of Merionethshire